Roy Rubin may refer to:

 Roy Rubin (basketball) (1925–2013), American former college and professional basketball coach
 Roy Rubin (rower) (born 1941), American rower